House for the Rich is a 2000 Russian drama film directed by Vladimir Fokin.

Plot
The film is set in the apartment of an old Moscow mansion. In the middle of the 19th century, the squandering nobleman Burkovsky sells the family home, and from that moment the apartment begins its transformation and it gets interwoven with the destinies of the people who have inhabited it: from the Narodnaya Volya members to the Bolshevik commissars, from the terrible communal apartment to the re-creation of the chic apartments by the "new Russian" Rumyanov - satirist, poet, actor. Hosts and lodgers, aristocrats and petty bourgeoises, believers and atheists - each of the many heroes lived their only life in the way they thought right as it happened to them ...

Cast 
 Valentin Gaft - Roman Rumyanov
 Vladimir Yeryomin - Evgeniy Burkovskiy
 Konstantin Khabensky - Yuri Sapozhnikov
 Yuri Stepanov - Serafim Pukhov (all ages)
 Valery Barinov - Akim Shpet
 Sergey Vinogradov - Georgiy Maksimov
 Polina Fokina - Kseniya Maksimova
 Tatiana Okunevskaya - Anna Kazimirovna (old)
 Irina Grinyova - Anna Kazimirovna (young)
 Yevgeny Sidikhin - Alexei Serebriakov
 Antonina Dmitrieva - Anna Stepanovna "Nyura" (old)
 Lyubava Aristarkhova - Nyura (young)
 Elena Kucherenko - Ira Sapozhnikova
 Valery Garkalin - Captain Skorokhodov
 Larisa Luzhina - Marina Mikhailovna
 Elena Romanova - Larisa
 Daria Mikhailova - Marina
  Yuri Nazarov - Vladilen Serebriakov
 Vladimir Sterzhakov - architect
 Lyubov Germanova - art expert
 Sergey Shekhovtsov - Gena
 Nina Persiyaninova - Gena's wife
 Irina Znamenshchikova - communal apartment inhabitant
 Alexey Kiryushchenko - gendarme
 Andrei Butin - gendarme
 Alexey Karpov - NKVD employee
 Danila Perov - NKVD employee

Awards
 Prize "Bronze Pegasus" (Vladimir Fokin) at the Moscow Pegasus Film Festival in 2000.
 Nomination for the Golden Aries in the category Best Screenplay (Anatoly Grebnev) in 2000.
 Special diploma of the jury of Belarusian cinematographers for the visual design of the film (Lyudmila Kusakova, Mikhail Kartashov) at the international film festival of the CIS and Baltic countries "Falling Leaves" in Minsk in 2000.
  Nika in the category Best Screenplay (Anatoly Grebnev) in 2000.

References

External links

Russian drama films
2000 drama films
2000 films
2000s Russian-language films